Blaženka Divjak (born 1 January 1967) is a Croatian scientist and university professor at the University of Zagreb, Faculty of Organization and Informatics in Varaždin. She served as Minister of Science and Education from 9 June 2017 until 23 July 2020

Political life 
Blaženka Divjak has led curricular reform of general education, reform of vocational education and training, enhancement of relevance of higher education and excellence of research in recent years. She was chairing EU Council of ministers for education and Council of ministers for research and space during Croatian presidency (January – June 2020).

Education 
She holds a PhD in Mathematics from the University of Zagreb, Faculty of Science and Mathematics. She served as Vice-Rector for students and study programs at the University of Zagreb (2010–2014).

Sources 
1. https://mzo.gov.hr/vijesti/tri-godine-promjena/3893

 

1967 births
Living people
People from Varaždin
Croatian mathematicians
University of Zagreb alumni
Women government ministers of Croatia
Government ministers of Croatia
21st-century Croatian women politicians
21st-century Croatian politicians